This lists of mines in India is subsidiary to the list of mines article and lists working, and future mines in the country and is organised by the primary mineral output. For practical purposes stone, marbles and other quarries may be included in this list. In India, the underground mine to surface mine ratio is 20:80 .

Diamond

Iron ore

Manganese

Copper

Bauxite

Coal

Petroleum

Gold

Lead ore

Uranium

References 

 
India
Mines